Carina Wimmer (born 27 August 1995 in Mühldorf, Bavaria) is a German pistol sport shooter. She will compete for Germany at the 2020 Summer Olympics, participating in the women's 10 metre air pistol and the mixed 10 metre air pistol team events.

Biography
Carina Wimmer was born on 27 August 1995 in Mühldorf, Bavaria. She began sport shooting at the age of 10 with her sister. Wimmer is currently a student at the Technical University of Munich perusing a Master of Health Science after receiving her bachelor's degree in health science.

Career

2021 European Shooting Championships
At the 2021 European Shooting Championships in Osijek, Croatia, Wimmer competed in the women's 10 metre air pistol event and came first with 242.3 points, ahead of Russian Vitalina Batsarashkina and French Celine Goberville who achieved 242.0 and 218.6 points respectively. Wimmer also participated on Germany's 25 metre pistol team at the championships with Doreen Vennekamp and Monika Karsch. The team won their final match against Bulgaria, clinching gold. Her gold medals granted her a quota spot at the 2020 Summer Olympics.

2021 ISSF World Cup
At the 2021 ISSF World Cup in Osijek, Wimmer placed second in the women's 10 metre air pistol event, scoring 237.5 points, 2.5 points behind first place Bulgarian Antoaneta Kostadinova. She was also a member of Germany's women's air pistol team with Sandra Reitz and Andrea Katharina Heckner. In the gold medal match on 25 June 2021, the team ended up six points short of beating the Bulgarian team, winning the silver medal.

2020 Summer Olympics
After her performance at the 2021 European Shooting Championships and 2021 ISSF World Cup, she qualified for the 2020 Summer Olympics in Tokyo, Japan, whose events were postponed a year due to the COVID-19 pandemic. She will compete for Germany in the women's 10 metre air pistol and the mixed 10 metre air pistol team events. Wimmer is paired in the latter event with two-time Olympic medalist Christian Reitz.

References

1995 births
People from Mühldorf
Sportspeople from Upper Bavaria
Shooters at the 2020 Summer Olympics
Olympic shooters of Germany
Living people